A DIMM (Dual In-line Memory Module), commonly called a RAM stick, comprises a series of dynamic random-access memory integrated circuits. These memory modules are mounted on a printed circuit board and designed for use in personal computers, workstations, printers, and servers. They are the predominant method for adding memory into a computer system. The vast majority of DIMMs are standardized through JEDEC standards, although there are proprietary DIMMs.

History 
DIMMs (Dual In-line Memory Module) were a 1990s upgrade for SIMMs (Single In-line Memory Modules) as Intel P5-based Pentium processors began to gain market share. The Pentium had a 64-bit bus width, which would require SIMMs installed in matched pairs in order to populate the data bus. The processor would then access the two SIMMs in parallel. 

DIMMs were introduced to eliminate this disadvantage. The contacts on SIMMs on both sides are redundant, while DIMMs have separate electrical contacts on each side of the module. This allowed them to double the SIMMs 32-bit data path into a 64-bit data path. 

The name "DIMM" was chosen as an acronym for Dual In-line Memory Module symbolizing the split in the contacts of a SIMM into two independent rows.  Many enhancements have occurred to the modules in the intervening years, but the word "DIMM" has remained as a generic term for computer memory modules.

Variants 
Variants of DIMMs support DDR, DDR2, DDR3, DDR4 and DDR5 RAM.

Common types of DIMMs include the following:

70 to 200 pins
 72-pin SO-DIMM (not the same as a 72-pin SIMM), used for FPM DRAM and EDO DRAM
 100-pin DIMM, used for printer SDRAM
 144-pin SO-DIMM, used for SDR SDRAM (less frequently for DDR2 SDRAM)
 168-pin DIMM, used for SDR SDRAM (less frequently for FPM/EDO DRAM in workstations/servers, may be 3.3 or 5 V)
 172-pin MicroDIMM, used for DDR SDRAM
 184-pin DIMM, used for DDR SDRAM
 200-pin SO-DIMM, used for DDR SDRAM and DDR2 SDRAM
 200-pin DIMM, used for FPM/EDO DRAM in some Sun workstations and servers.

201 to 300 pins
 204-pin SO-DIMM, used for DDR3 SDRAM
 214-pin MicroDIMM, used for DDR2 SDRAM
 240-pin DIMM, used for DDR2 SDRAM, DDR3 SDRAM and FB-DIMM DRAM
 244-pin MiniDIMM, used for DDR2 SDRAM
 260-pin SO-DIMM, used for DDR4 SDRAM
 260-pin SO-DIMM, with different notch position than on DDR4 SO-DIMMs, used for UniDIMMs that can carry either DDR3 or DDR4 SDRAM
 278-pin DIMM, used for HP high density SDRAM.
 288-pin DIMM, used for DDR4 SDRAM and DDR5 SDRAM

SO-DIMM 

A SO-DIMM (pronounced "so-dimm" , also spelled "SODIMM") or small outline DIMM, is a smaller alternative to a DIMM, being roughly half the physical size of a regular DIMM.

SO-DIMMs are often used in systems that have limited space, which include laptops, notebooks, small-footprint personal computers such as those based on Nano-ITX motherboards, high-end upgradable office printers, and networking hardware such as routers and NAS devices.  They are usually available with the same size data path and speed ratings of the regular DIMMs though normally with smaller capacities.

SDR 168-pin SDRAM 

On the bottom edge of 168-pin DIMMs there are two notches, and the location of each notch determines a particular feature of the module.  The first notch is the DRAM key position, which represents RFU (reserved future use), registered, and unbuffered DIMM types (left, middle and right position, respectively).  The second notch is the voltage key position, which represents 5.0 V, 3.3 V, and RFU DIMM types (order is the same as above).

DDR DIMMs 

DDR, DDR2, DDR3, DDR4 and DDR5 all have different pin counts and/or different notch positions.  As of October 2022, DDR5 SDRAM is a modern emerging type of dynamic random access memory (DRAM) with a high-bandwidth ("double data rate") interface, and has been in use since 2020. It is the higher-speed successor to DDR, DDR2, DDR3, and DDR4. DDR5 SDRAM is neither forward nor backward compatible with any earlier type of random access memory (RAM) because of different signalling voltages, timings, as well as other differing factors between the technologies and their implementation.

SPD EEPROM 
A DIMM's capacity and other operational parameters may be identified with serial presence detect (SPD), an additional chip which contains information about the module type and timing for the memory controller to be configured correctly. The SPD EEPROM connects to the System Management Bus and may also contain thermal sensors (TS-on-DIMM).

Error correction 
ECC DIMMs are those that have extra data bits which can be used by the system memory controller to detect and correct errors. There are numerous ECC schemes, but perhaps the most common is Single Error Correct, Double Error Detect (SECDED) which uses an extra byte per 64-bit word. ECC modules usually carry a multiple of 9 instead of a multiple of 8 chips.

Ranking 

Sometimes memory modules are designed with two or more independent sets of DRAM chips connected to the same address and data buses; each such set is called a rank. Ranks that share the same slot, only one rank may be accessed at any given time; it is specified by activating the corresponding rank's chip select (CS) signal. The other ranks on the module are deactivated for the duration of the operation by having their corresponding CS signals deactivated. DIMMs are currently being commonly manufactured with up to four ranks per module. Consumer DIMM vendors have recently begun to distinguish between single and dual ranked DIMMs.

After a memory word is fetched, the memory is typically inaccessible for an extended period of time while the sense amplifiers are charged for access of the next cell.  By interleaving the memory (e.g. cells 0, 4, 8, etc. are stored together in one rank), sequential memory accesses can be performed more rapidly because sense amplifiers have 3 cycles of idle time for recharging, between accesses.

DIMMs are often referred to as "single-sided" or "double-sided" to describe whether the DRAM chips are located on one or both sides of the module's printed circuit board (PCB). However, these terms may cause confusion, as the physical layout of the chips does not necessarily relate to how they are logically organized or accessed.

JEDEC decided that the terms "dual-sided", "double-sided", or "dual-banked" were not correct when applied to registered DIMMs (RDIMMs).

Organization 
Most DIMMs are built using "×4" ("by four") or "×8" ("by eight") memory chips with nine chips per side; "×4" and "×8" refer to the data width of the DRAM chips in bits.

In the case of "×4" registered DIMMs, the data width per side is 36 bits; therefore, the memory controller (which requires 72 bits) needs to address both sides at the same time to read or write the data it needs. In this case, the two-sided module is single-ranked.  For "×8" registered DIMMs, each side is 72 bits wide, so the memory controller only addresses one side at a time (the two-sided module is dual-ranked).

The above example applies to ECC memory that stores 72 bits instead of the more common 64. There would also be one extra chip per group of eight, which is not counted.

Speeds 
For various technologies, there are certain bus and device clock frequencies that are standardized; there is also a decided nomenclature for each of these speeds for each type.

DIMMs based on Single Data Rate (SDR) DRAM have the same bus frequency for data, address and control lines.  DIMMs based on Double Data Rate (DDR) DRAM have data but not the strobe at double the rate of the clock; this is achieved by clocking on both the rising and falling edge of the data strobes.  Power consumption and voltage gradually became lower with each generation of DDR-based DIMMs.

Another influence is Column Access Strobe (CAS) latency, or CL which affects memory access speed. This is the delay time between the READ command and the moment data is available. See main article  CAS/CL

Form factors 

Several form factors are commonly used in DIMMs. These fit into vertical DIMM sockets for a 1U platform.

With the advent of blade servers, angled slots have once again become common in order to accommodate LP form factor DIMMs in these space-constrained boxes. These will fit vertically in ATCA systems.

These form factors include 240-pin DIMM, SO-DIMM, Mini-DIMM and Micro-DIMM.

As of Q2 2017, Asus has had a PCI-E based "DIMM.2", which has a similar socket to DDR3 DIMMs and is used to put in a module to connect up to two M.2 NVMe solid-state drives. However, it cannot use common DDR type ram and does not have much support other than Asus.

Regular DIMMs are generally 133.35 mm in length, SO-DIMMs 67.6 mm.

See also 

 Dual in-line package (DIP)
 Memory scrambling
 Memory geometry logical configuration of RAM modules (channels, ranks, banks, etc.)
 Motherboard
 NVDIMM non-volatile DIMM
 Row hammer
 Rambus in-line memory module (RIMM)
 Single in-line memory module (SIMM)
 Single in-line package (SIP)
 Zig-zag in-line package (ZIP)
 Compression Attached Memory Module (CAMM)

References

External links 

 How to Install PC Memory guides
 Very Low Profile (VLP) DDR2 Whitepaper (PDF)
 Is 4GB RAM Good For a Laptop?

 Computer memory form factor